Xerotricha mariae is a species of air-breathing land snail, terrestrial pulmonate gastropod mollusks in the family Geomitridae. This species is endemic to Spain.

References

Fauna of Spain
Geomitridae
Endemic fauna of Spain
Gastropods described in 1972
Taxonomy articles created by Polbot